Potters Bar is a town in Hertfordshire, England,  north of central London. In 2011, it had a population of 21,882. In 2022 the population was around 23,325.

Within the historic county of Middlesex until 1965, the town dates to the early 13th century but remained a small, mainly agricultural, settlement until the arrival of the Great Northern Railway in 1850. It is now part of the London commuter belt.

Etymology
The origin of the Potters element of the town's name is uncertain but is generally thought to be either a reference to a Roman pottery, believed to have been sited locally, or alternatively to the Pottere family who lived in neighbouring South Mimms parish. The Bar is thought to refer to the gates leading from the South Mimms parish and into the Enfield Chase parish, or possibly from a toll on the Great North Road, said to have been by what is now the disused Green Man pub, or at the current entrance to Morven House.

History
Potters Bar is located on the Great North Road, one of two road routes from the City of London to the north of England. The road was originally numbered as the A1, and later the A1000.

Potters Bar was historically part of Middlesex and formed the Potters Bar Urban District of that county from 1934. From 1894 to 1934 its area had formed the South Mimms Rural District. In 1965 the district was transferred to Hertfordshire County Council while most of the rest of Middlesex County Council became part of Greater London.

In 1939 it had a population of 13,681, increasing to 24,613 in 1971. In 1974 the urban district was abolished and the area became part of the borough of Hertsmere. Having been part of Middlesex, the area continued to form part of the Metropolitan Police District; with the creation of the Greater London Authority it was transferred to the Hertfordshire Constabulary in 2000.

Byng family
Wrotham Park estate, home of the Byng family, sits within Potters Bar and Barnet on 2,500 acres of land. The Byng family still own a lot of land in the Potters Bar area and The Admiral Byng pub in Darkes Lane is named after Admiral John Byng, who was executed for failing to obey orders in the Minorca campaign.

In the early hours of 1 October 1916, Lieurenant Wulstan Tempest shot down Germany's most famous zeppelin, the L31. It was captained by Heinrich Mathy with his crew of 18. All were killed when the flaming zeppelin fell into an ancient oak tree on the Aokmere Estate, Oakmere House at the time being rented by Mrs Forbes. The deadly raids over England declined after this. The 19 German sailors (zeppelins were naval) were buried in the local cemetery, and decades later moved to Cannock Chase.The Potters Bar Museum has a Zeppelin display, with relics of the L31.

Geography

Climate
Potters Bar experiences an oceanic climate (Köppen climate classification Cfb) similar to almost all of the United Kingdom.

Transport

The A1 was built as a major 'arterial' road and a crossroads at Bignells Corner linked it to the Barnet – St Albans road. Potters Bar is now also served by junctions 23 and 24 of the M25 motorway.

Potters Bar railway station is the highest on the line between London's King's Cross railway station and York. The Great Northern route serves various North London suburbs to the south before terminating at either King's Cross or Moorgate station. Northbound, the railway runs to Hatfield, Welwyn Garden City, Cambridge, and Peterborough.

Potters Bar has a bus depot that services local bus routes as well as some London bus routes. The 84 bus route runs north-west to St. Albans. Other routes include the 298 to Arnos Grove, the 313 to Enfield and Chingford, the 242 to Waltham Cross, the 398 to Watford and the 610 to Enfield and Hatfield. There are also school bus services run from various places to Dame Alice Owen's School and to Chancellor's School.

Potters Bar rail accidents

Potters Bar has been the scene of three train crashes; two major and one minor. On 19 March 1898, a train crashed on the platform, but no one was killed or seriously injured. On the night of 10 February 1946, a local train hit buffers at the station, became derailed, and two express trains travelling in opposite directions struck the wreckage. On 10 May 2002, a northbound train derailed at high speed, killing seven people and seriously injuring another 11. On 10 May 2003, a small piece of art that resembles seven faces was erected at the station as a memorial to those killed.

Churches
There are eight churches in Potters Bar. These include St Mary the Virgin and All Saints' Church at the top of the Walk, the first Anglican parish in the town created from the parish of South Mimms in the 1800s. Other churches are Our Lady and St Vincent ( Roman Catholic), King Charles the Martyr, Christ Church, Potters Bar Baptist Church, St John's Methodist Church and Causeway Free Church. Potters Bar Spiritualist Church is on Hill Rise. There was briefly a Salvation Army in Station Road. There is also the Jain Temple at the Oshwal Centre, which "recreates a general Māru-Gurjara aesthetic".

Education
There are six primary and infant state schools in Potters Bar and the surrounding area; they are Cranborne School, Ladbrooke JMI, Little Heath Primary, Oakmere Primary, Pope Paul RC Primary and Wroxham School.

Mount Grace School is a mixed grant maintained School in Potters Bar opened in 1954.

Lochinver house school is an all-boys preparatory school in Potters Bar, which opened in 1947.

Stormont School is an all-girls preparatory school in Potters Bar, which opened in 1944.

Dame Alice Owen's School is a mixed grant-maintained school in Potters Bar. Founded in 1613 and based in Islington until 1973, it is unusual in its 'Visitation' and 'Beer Money' traditions.

The town also houses many veterinary medicine (mostly third, fourth and fifth-year) students from the Royal Veterinary College.

Sports, entertainment and recreation
Potters Bar has a King George's Field in memorial to King George V, which is situated behind the Furzefield Centre. There is a swimming pool and leisure centre run by Hertsmere council, which is home to St Albans and Hertsmere Canoe Club. Also in the town are Potters Bar Town F.C., Potters Bar Swimming Club (PBSC), a Scuba diving Club (the Potters Bar Sub Aqua Club), a tennis club, a cricket club. The Wyllyotts Centre is a theatre, cinema and events venue, and is also the location of the town's museum. Potters Bar is also home to the Hertfordshire Showband (formally known as the Marching Blues).

In December 2018, the golf course at Potters Bar closed after 95 years.

In 1983, the area around Potters Bar was used for the on-location filming of the comic-horror film Bloodbath at the House of Death. Also, in 2005, David Walliams and Matt Lucas shot two scenes for the third season of the comedy Little Britain: one scene at Mount Grace School gym, the other at a wedding shop on the High Street. Potters Bar is also home to a performing arts school, Top Hat Stage School, which has been running classes at Elm Court Community Centre since 1994.

Notable residents
 Amanda Abbington, actress
 Acker Bilk, clarinetist, divided his time between Pensford, Somerset, and Potters Bar
 Bernard Butler, musician, record producer, and guitarist in Suede.
 Roger Fenton, Crimean war photographer who lived at Mount Grace manor house
 Martin Freeman, actor
 Tony Jacklin, golfer, whose home golf club was Potters Bar Golf Club
 Terry Lightfoot, jazz musician, born in Potters Bar
 Storm Thorgerson, graphic designer, born in Potters Bar
 Dolly Shepherd, parachutist and entertainer, born in Potters Bar.
John Yianni, board game designer (notably of Hive), born in Potters Bar

Twinnings
  Viernheim, Germany
  Franconville, Val-d'Oise, France (since 1973)

Notes and references
Notes 

References

External links

 
 The Potters Bar Society
 pottersbar.org – local information

 
Towns in Hertfordshire
Populated places established in the 13th century
Unparished areas in Hertfordshire
Hertsmere
Middlesex